Hill Motorsports is an American professional stock car racing team that currently competes in the NASCAR Craftsman Truck Series. The team is owned by Timmy Hill and Tyler Hill. The team currently fields the No. 56 Toyota Tundra full-time for Timmy Hill and Tyler Hill.

Cup Series

Car No. 56 history
Hill Motorsports made their Cup series debut in 1991, with  Jerry Hill running the #56 Hill Motorsports Pontiac that he would drive throughout his Cup career. In his debut at Dover, Hill started and finished 38th after vibration problems, only completing 39 laps. In his second start at Rockingham, Hill managed to improve on qualifying, but finished 38th just the same after being flagged.

Hill would run four races for the team in 1992. He managed his best finish of the year of 27th at Rockingham, the only race he finished. He also improved on qualifying in 1992, earning a career best of 36th at Dover.

Hill ran two races in 1993, his last Cup starts. They both came at Rockingham, they were both 38th-place finishes and they were both DNFs. So, with the dismal results, Hill left the Cup Series.

Car No. 56 results

Craftsman Truck Series

Truck No. 5 history
In 2022, Hill Motorsports announced it would run this second truck on a part time basis. Tyler Hill would fail to qualify at COTA but qualified 3 more times so far this season. Tyler failed to qualify for Richmond but qualified for his remaining attempts in 2022 with a best finish of 21st at Kansas.

Truck No. 5 results

Truck No. 56 history

Hill Motorsports made their Truck Series debut at Martinsville in 2019 with Timmy Hill where they finished 21st. Tyler Hill drove the truck at Dover and finished 20th. Timmy Hill came back and finished 16th at Charlotte and 24th Chicagoland. Tyler Hill finished 26th at Iowa. The highlight of the season came at the Texas Roadhouse 200 in Martinsville, where Timmy Hill scored the team's first-ever top 5 finish.

Bobby Reuse and Carson Hocevar both took part in races in the No. 56 truck. On both occasions, the truck was prepared by Jordan Anderson Racing, though the truck was still officially classified as a Hill Motorsports entry.

In 2020, Gus Dean joined the team for the season opener at Daytona International Speedway.

In 2021, Mike Marlar joined the team for the Pinty's Dirt Truck Race.
Later on, Tyler Hill drove the #56 to a 2nd place finish at Talladega, setting a new best finish for the team being defeated by Tate Fogleman.

In 2022, Timmy Hill would drive the 56 truck full-time.

For 2023, Hill Motorsports announced that both Timmy and Tyler Hill would split time behind the 56 truck with Timmy driving the season opening race at Daytona.

Truck No. 56 results

References

External links

NASCAR teams